Osmania biscuit is a popular tea biscuit from Hyderabad, India.

History

The biscuits were first baked on the demand of the last Nizam of Hyderabad, Mir Osman Ali Khan, who wanted a snack that was a little sweet and a little salty. Variations of Osmania biscuits are found in other states too; the 'butter biscuit' of Chennai is similar.

It is one of the cultural identities in Hyderabad and is especially sold in places like Charminar and Old Hyderabad. It was sold at the cafes like New Grand Hotel in the vicinity of the Osmania Hospital, demanding the bakers in the city to add the item in the menu along with the Irani chai.

See also
Flour kurabiye

References

Biscuits
Hyderabadi cuisine
Telangana cuisine
Indian snack foods